Marcos Baghdatis was the defending champion, but chose to compete in ATP 500 in Washington instead.Dudi Sela won the title, defeating Ričardas Berankis 7–5, 6–2 in the finals.

Seeds

Draw

Finals

Top half

Bottom half

References
 Main Draw
 Qualifying Draw

Odlum Brown Vancouver Open
Vancouver Open